Alan Samson Fuller (1 August 1912 – 1 May 1995) was an Australian rules footballer who played for the Hawthorn Football Club in the Victorian Football League (VFL).

He later served in the Australian Army during World War II.

Notes

External links 

1912 births
1995 deaths
Australian rules footballers from Victoria (Australia)
Hawthorn Football Club players
People from Boulder, Western Australia
Australian Army personnel of World War II
Military personnel from Western Australia